George Riley is a British sports broadcaster from Leeds.

Career 
Riley joined BBC Radio 5 Live in 2004, and was the voice of sport on 5 Live Breakfast from 2011 until 2017. He also presented 5 live Sport for the station, and commentated on rugby league, snooker and darts for BBC TV and radio.

Riley has reported at major events including the 2012 London Olympics and Paralympic Games, UEFA Euro 2012, the 2014 FIFA World Cup, the 2013 Ashes, the 2013 Rugby League World Cup, the 2014 Commonwealth Games in Glasgow, as well as Wimbledon, the Cheltenham Festival, Super League and Challenge Cup finals each year.

He presented the BBC's Late Kick Off Football League show in 2013, in Yorkshire and Lincolnshire. He was a regular face and voice on the BBC's rugby league coverage, presenting the Super League Show on BBC2, and commentating on all major games for BBC Radio 5 Live.

In July 2015, he was confirmed as one of the presenters of Channel 5's Football League highlights show, Football League Tonight, alongside Kelly Cates. Riley then co-hosted alongside Lynsey Hipgrave during the 2016-17 season.

Riley appeared as himself in Armando Iannucci's award-winning political satire The Thick Of It in 2009.

Riley was suspended by the BBC in 2017 following 'multiple complaints' of sexual assault. In 2019 the corporation told its staff he would 'never work again' for the BBC after claims he had grabbed women between the legs and behaved inappropriately in the workplace and at work events.

Since leaving the BBC, Riley has been working with men’s mental health charities, alongside his work as a leading rugby league commentator and writer.

Personal life 

Riley is a charity ambassador for Joseph's Goal and the Steve Prescott Foundation (SPF), for whom he runs regular marathons. His fundraising efforts saw him run 100 miles in 2014 and four marathons in eight weeks in 2015.

Riley completed his 9th marathon in 2022 running for close friend Rob Burrow.

References

Living people
British sports broadcasters
Year of birth missing (living people)